West Okoboji Lake (sometimes known as West Lake Okoboji) is a natural body of water, approximately  in area, in Dickinson County in northwestern  Iowa in the United States. It is part of the chain of lakes known as the Iowa Great Lakes. The area was long inhabited by the Santee or Dakota Sioux. The Dakota-language name for the lake was Minnetonka, meaning "great waters".

The cities of Arnolds Park, Okoboji, West Okoboji, and Wahpeton sit on its shore. Okoboji was derived from the Dakota name for the lake, and Wahpeton was the name of one of the major historic Sioux bands in the nineteenth century. Today the Sisseton-Wahpeton Sioux are a federally recognized tribe.

Geography 

Recreation
The depth of the lake makes it a popular regional destination for motor boating, water skiing, sailing, and swimming. The lake is also a popular fishing destination in the region. The main catches in the lake are yellow perch, bluegill, and walleye. It also contains significant populations of smallmouth bass, northern pike, muskie, crappie and white bass, black bass.

Blue Water: Myth or Fact?

For nearly a century a myth has circulated that West Okoboji is one of only three blue water lakes in the world, the others being Lake Geneva in Wisconsin (sometimes referenced as located in Switzerland) and Lake Louise in Canada.  Articles stating various versions of this erroneous information as fact have appeared in the Spencer Daily Reporter  and in the Des Moines Register as recently as 2009, and appear in other tourist publications and websites.

There is no scientific basis to this assertion and it likely originated with some early “boosters” of Dickinson County.  Still, it raises the question as to where the idea originated from, and why Lake Geneva and Lake Louise are often mentioned as the other two lakes. 
Dr. John Schalles has taught limnology at Iowa Lakeside Laboratory, a biological field station located on the shores of Lake West Okoboji, for several decades and has become very familiar with the myth having heard it from his students and local community members. “Folks try to persuade me this information was first published in a National Geographic article, but I have found no record of it.”  

Dr. Roger Bachman, another nationally recognized limnologist, agrees and says the Society denies it ever made such a ranking.  “While the term ‘blue water lake’ is not a scientific term, it is a fact that lakes and oceans with exceptionally pure waters like Lake Tahoe, Crater Lake, Lake Superior and the Sargasso Sea appear blue to the eye. When sunlight penetrates these waters the wavelengths (colors) of light are absorbed more strongly than blue, so that more of the blue remains to be scattered back out of the water surface.”  

Schalles has a theory, however, as to how the myth originated, in particular the association of West Okoboji and Lake Geneva as similarly unique lakes. In the early twentieth century E. A. Birge and Chancy Juday, two scientists today known as founders of the study of North American limnology, conducted studies on numerous lakes in the Midwest, including East and West Okoboji.  In one publication, the authors make frequent comparisons between measurements taken at Lake West Okoboji and Lake Geneva in Wisconsin.  Schalles wonders if these studies could have been the basis for the claim of the similarity between the two lakes, possibly struck by the fact that their local lake was being compared to one of the most famous lakes in the world, or perhaps thinking that this comparison (even if they had the information wrong) was a great way to impress folks and bring in more visitors. 

Regardless of the fact, there is no scientific basis that West Okoboji is a blue lake, scientists and non-scientists alike concur the lake has exceptional water quality and color for a lake in its region. In fact, the Iowa Department of Natural Resources has given West Okoboji and its watershed a special designation as an Outstanding Iowa Water.

See also 
 Big Spirit Lake
 East Okoboji Lake

References

Non-cite template citations
1. Birge, E.A., and C. Juday. 1920. A limnological reconnaissance of West Okoboji. University of Iowa Studies of Natural History. 9(1) 3 – 56.
2. wpl-reference.pbworks.com/w/page/12420954/Iowa%20Lakes%20-%20blue%20water
3. www.iowadnr.gov/InsideDNR/RegulatoryWater/WaterQualityStandards/Antidegradation.aspx
4. Wild Wednesday, Iowa Lakeside Laboratory, July 3, 2013

External links
Iowa Department of Natural Resources site on East Okoboji Lake
University of Iowa site on West Okoboji Lake chemistry
U.S. Geological Survey site on West Okoboji Lake current temperature
Okoboji Underwater Photography Documentary produced by Iowa Public Television

Bodies of water of Dickinson County, Iowa
Lakes of Iowa

ht:West Okoboji, Iowa